Palma is both a surname and a given name of Spanish, Portuguese and Italian origin. Notable people with the name include:
 Palma Vecchio (c. 1480–1528), Italian painter
 Palma il Giovane (1548/50–1628), Italian painter
 Adalberto Palma (born 1981), Mexican football player
 Adiel Palma (born 1970), Cuban baseball player
 Alejandra Palma (born 1960), Argentine field hockey player
 Andrea Palma (1644/64–1730), Italian architect
 Andrea Palma (actress) (1903–1987), Mexican actress
 Angélica Palma (1878–1935), Peruvian writer
 Annabel Palma, American politician
 Armando Contreras Palma (born 1947), Salvadoran football manager
 Arturo Alessandri Palma (1868–1950), Chilean political figure
 Belita Palma (1932–1988), Angolan singer
 Brian De Palma (born 1940), American film director and writer
 Carlo Di Palma (1925–2004), Italian cinematographer
 Cecilia Muñoz-Palma (1913–2006), Filipino jurist
 Clemente Palma (1872–1946), Peruvian writer and critic
 Donald Palma, American double bassist, conductor and instructor
 Emilio Palma (born 1978), Argentine national born in Antarctica
 Enrique Tortosa Palma (born 1991), Spanish footballer
 Esteban de Palma (born 1967), Argentinian volleyball player
 Ever Palma (born 1992), Mexican racewalker
 Félix J. Palma, Spanish author 
 Fernando Palma (born 1993), Honduran diplomat, actor, model
 Gustavo Adolfo Palma (1920–2009), Guatemalan singer and actor
 Isaac Palma (born 1990), Mexican racewalker
 Joe Palma (1905–1994), American actor
 Jorge Palma (born 1950), Portuguese singer and songwriter 
 José Palma (1876–1903), Filipino poet and soldier
 José Ignacio Palma (1910–1988), Chilean engineer and politician
 José Joaquín Palma (1844–1911), Cuban revolutionary and poet
 José Luis Di Palma (born 1966), Argentine racing driver
 Jose S. Palma (born 1950), Filipino archbishop
 Joseph-François Charpentier de Cossigny de Palma (1736–1809), French engineer and explorer
 Jula de Palma (born 1932), Italian singer
 Laura Palma, Mexican actress and model
 Leticia Palma (1926–2009), Mexican actress 
 Luis González Palma (born 1957), Guatemalan photographer
 Manuel Solís Palma (1917–2009), Panamanian politician 
 Marcelo Palma (born 1966), Brazilian racewalker
 Mário Palma (born 1950), Portuguese basketball coach
 Mario Alberto Molina Palma (born 1948), Panama-born archbishop of Guatemala
 Master of San Martino alla Palma (fl. 14th century), Florentine painter
 Michael Palma (born 1945), American poet and translator
 Milagros Palma (born 1973), Cuban fencer
 Francesco Nitto Palma (born 1950), Italian politician
 Odelmys Palma (born 1971), Cuban javelin thrower
 Omar Palma (born 1958), Argentine football player
 Patricio Di Palma (born 1971), Argentine racing driver
 Paulo da Palma (born 1965), German-born Portuguese football player
 Piero de Palma (born 1916), Italian singer
 Precioso Palma, Filipino novelist and playwright 
 Rafael Palma (1874–1939), Filipino politician, writer, educator and mason 
 Raúl Palma (born 1950), Mexican basketball player
 Ricardo Palma (1833–1919), Peruvian author, scholar, librarian and politician
 Rossy de Palma (born 1964), Spanish actress and model
 Ruben Palma (born 1954), Chilean-born Danish writer
 Rubén Luis di Palma (1944–2000), Argentine racing driver
 Samuel De Palma (1918–2002), American diplomat
 Silvestro Palma (1754–1834), Italian composer
 Sylvester Romero Palma, bishop of Belize
 Tina Monzon-Palma (born 1951), Filipino news anchor
 Tomás Estrada Palma (1832–1908), Cuban political figure